Events from the year 1549 in art.

Events
Sculptor Hans Vischer, the last of the Vischer Family of Nuremberg, leaves the city.

Works

Bartolommeo Bandinelli - God the Father (statue), in the cloister of Santa Croce, Florence
Bronzino – Portrait of Giovanni de' Medici
Tintoretto – St. Roch in the Hospital

Births
July 5 - Francesco Maria del Monte, Italian Cardinal and arts patron (Caravaggio) (died 1627)
September 1 - Cesare Aretusi, Italian painter (died 1612)
date unknown - Giovanni Contarini, Venetian painter (died 1605)
probable (born 1549/1551) - Giovanni Ambrogio Figino, Italian painter (died 1608)

Deaths
February 14 - Il Sodoma, Italian Mannerist painter (born 1477)
March - Aelbrecht Bouts, Dutch painter
date unknown - Jean Juste, Italian sculptor (born 1485)

 
Years of the 16th century in art